Annular elastolytic giant-cell granuloma (also known as "Giant cell elastophagocytosis," "Meischer's granuloma," "Miescher's granuloma of the face") is a cutaneous condition characterized histologically by a dermal infiltrate of macrophages.

Treatment 
Localized granuloma annulare has a tendency towards spontaneous resolution. Localized lesions have been treated with potent topical corticosteroids.

See also 
 Actinic granuloma
 List of cutaneous conditions

References

External links 

Monocyte- and macrophage-related cutaneous conditions